The 1968 Campeonato Brasileiro Série A (officially the 1968 Torneio Roberto Gomes Pedrosa) was the 11th edition of the Campeonato Brasileiro Série A. It began on August 24 and ended on December 10. Santos won the championship, the 6th national title of the club at 9 years of tournament contention. Pelé won the title with Santos, which was the 6th and last Brazilian title he conquered.

Championship format

First-phase: the 17 participants play all against all twice, but divided into two groups (one 8 and one 9) for classification, in the Group A, each team plays two more matches against any other. The first 2 of each group are classified for the finals.
Final-phase: the four clubs classified play all against all in a single round. The club with most points at this stage is the champion.
Tie-breaking criteria:
1 - Goal difference2 - Raffle

With one victory, a team still gained 2 points, instead of 3.

First phase

Group A

Group B

Final phase

Matches:

References
 1968 Taça de Prata at RSSSF

Torneio Roberto Gomes Pedrosa
Robert
Bra
B